Londa is a municipality in the Metropolitan City of Florence in the central Italian region Tuscany.

Geography
The neighbouring communes are Dicomano, Pratovecchio, Rufina, San Godenzo and Stia.

The toponym is first recorded in a document of 1028 as Unda, meaning "wave" and alluding to the torrent on which it is situated. The wave appears in the communal coat of arms.

References

Municipalities of the Metropolitan City of Florence